Pinnoctopus cordiformis is a species of octopus found around the coasts of New Zealand.

Description 
Pinnoctopus cordiformis is identifiable by its orange-brown or purple-grey colouration; iridescent white spots are found on the arms and web. No white spots can be seen on the mantle.

Pinnoctopus has been seen to reach sizes of over 1m in length and 9 kilograms in weight, however, specimens of this size are seldom seen, due to residing in deeper waters.

Pinnoctopus cordiformis'''s closest relative is Octopus huttoni. The two can be easily distinguished by comparing a range of features: Octopus huttoni is about the size of a fist when fully mature, so is considerably smaller than the P, cordiformis; Octopus huttoni has a single row of suckers, which run up each tentacle, as opposed to Pinnoctopus, which has two rows of oppositely-arranged suckers.Villanueva R, Norman MD 2008. Biology of the plank‐ tonic stages of benthic octopuses. Oceanography and Marine Biology: an annual review 46: 105–202. Octopus species have no bone structure, which allows easy escape from confined spaces; they also have an ability to avoid towed nets, making them difficult to study in the wild.Pinnoctopus cordiformis has a globe-shaped head, which contains the brain and other vital organs, it also has a mouth and sharp beak which is used for killing prey. The skin of the octopus is smooth and can change colour slightly to hide from both predators and prey. As a form of self-defence the octopus has an ink-like substance which can be released to deter a predator in order to escape. The eyes of an octopus are considered to be far more developed than those of many other marine species, they are primarily nocturnal and undertake a range of techniques to both escape predators and find prey.

 Distribution 

 Natural global range Pinnoctopus cordiformis is primarily found in New Zealand, however they have also been recorded to have been recognized off the coast of South Australia.O'Shea S, Jackson GD 2010. Class Cephalopoda. In: Cook S de C ed. New Zealand Coastal Marine Invertebrates, volume 1. Christchurch, Canterbury University Press. Pp. 541–559, 565, 566.

 New Zealand range Pinnoctopus cordiformis is known as a reef octopus, and have been found around New Zealand in Stewart Island (47˚S) to south of Leigh (36˚S); they have also been found in the Chatham Islands (35˚S to 48˚S).

 Habitat preferences Pinnoctopus has been found in waters as deep as 300m, however it can be found it shallow waters close to coastlines. They are commonly found on the sea floor and occasionally in shallow tidal rock pools. As it grows it ventures into subtidal reefs, here they are among the largest predators feeding off crayfish, crabs, and shell fish. Seagrass and seaweed beds are also common habitats for the Pinnoctopus cordiformis.

 Life cycle/phenology 
The life cycle of Pinnoctopus cordifomis is relatively short. Once they reach full size, they find a mate. The male dies after the mating process; females brood their eggs in a den for approximately 80 days. She does not feed for the duration or leave the den. A short time before the eggs hatch, the female ventures out and dies a short distance away from the den.Pinnoctopus cordiformis can have 56,000–232,000 eggs; other octopuses such as Thaumeledone zeiss, a rare deep sea octopus only has tens of eggs.

Octopods have two different strategies in terms of spawning, the female can either hatch few large eggs which are well developed hatchlings and adopt the benthic promptly. The females can also spawn large quantities of small eggs, these turn into 'planktonic free-swimming paralarvae', these have small suckers, few chromatophores and a translucent musculature.

The eggs of Pinnoctopus cordifomis are of intermediate size (6.43 ± 0.21 mm L; 1.45 ± 0.11 mm W; 6.41 ± 0.52 mg TW) the yolk can be seen through the wall of the egg and represents approximately 57% of the eggs size, they are pear shaped. Once the eggs are hatched paralarvae are released which survive without intervention for the duration of their life cycle.

The lifespan of Pinnoctopus cordiformis has been seldom studied; however it is predicted to be between 12–24 months, depending on mating time.

 Diet and foraging Pinnoctopus cordiformis leaps on any potential prey, wraps its tentacles around it and paralises it with salivary toxin, the octopus then used its 'parrot-like' beak to break up and digest the prey. They generally wait by the entrances of caves or crevasses for unsuspecting fish, crustaceons, molluscs, other octopuses and other edible invertebrates.Pinnoctopus cordiformis has the ability to break open shellfish with its beak or by pulling it apart to eat the fish inside.

Rock lobster and blue cod are two of the primary prey options for Pinnoctopus cordiformis, they get into fishing pots and devour the catch before the fisherman gets a chance. In spring 1970 the Hokianga mean morality rate for blue cod and rock lobster increased to 35%.

 Predators, parasites, and diseases Pinncotopus cordiformis has a large number of predators which are largely the reason for the relatively small and dispersed population. New Zealand sea lions, Buller's albatross, sharks and whales all prey on Pinnoctopus.

 Cultural uses 
A Maori legend states that the Polynesian navigator Kupe followed a giant octopus known as Te Wheke-o-Muturangi. This octopus was eating all the fish needed for the tribe. Kupe eventually tracked it down in the Cook Strait and killed it by tricking it into holding some water containers while he struck it on the head.

Early Maori used to catch octopus by hand. One hand would act as bait whilst the other was used to pick it up and kill it.

TaxonomyPinnoctopus cordiformis has been regarded as a synonym of Octopus maorum and there is no existing type specimen of P. cordiformis. There do appear to be consistent differences between specimens identified as P. cordiformis and those identified as O. maorum which suggests that there is a second species but this species more closely resembles a species of the genus Enteroctopus, with the description closely resembling Enteroctopus zealandicus. The name the name Pinnoctopus cordiformis is regarded as unresolved, a nomen dubium, by some authorities.

References

Further reading
Boyle PR, Daly HI 2000. Fecundity and spawning in a deep-water cirromorph octopus. Marine Biology 137: 317–324.
Carrasco SA, Maltrain R, Villenas F, Vega MA 2012. New records of early life-stages of cephalopods in the Chiloé Interior Sea. Latin American Journal of Aquatic Research 40: 229–235.
Harliwich, Dean D. 2011. Behavioural aspects of the New Zealand octopus Pinnoctopus cordiformis: acclimation, sleep deprivation and responses to video stimuli
Villanueva R 1995. Experimental rearing and growth of planktonic Octopus vulgaris from hatchlings to settlement. Canadian Journal of Fisheries and Aquatic Science 52: 2639–2650.
Villanueva R, Quintana D, Petroni G, Bozzano A 2011. Factors influencing the embryonic development and hatchling size of the oceanic squid Illex coindetii'' following in vitro fertilization. Journal of Experimental Marine Biology and Ecology 407: 54–62.

Cephalopods described in 1832
Cephalopods of Oceania
Endemic fauna of New Zealand
Endemic molluscs of New Zealand
Molluscs of New Zealand
Molluscs of the Pacific Ocean
New Zealand seafood
Octopodidae